Geoffrey G. Ward is a former professional rugby league footballer who played in the 1950s and 1960s.

Playing career

County honours
Geoffrey Ward won a cap for Yorkshire while at Castleford playing , i.e. number 3, in the 33-10 victory over Lancashire at Hull FC's stadium on 23 September 1964.

References

External links
Search for "Ward" at rugbyleagueproject.org
Geoff Ward Memory Box Search at archive.castigersheritage.com

Living people
Castleford Tigers players
English rugby league players
Place of birth missing (living people)
Rugby league centres
Year of birth missing (living people)
Yorkshire rugby league team players